Ainhice-Mongelos is a commune in the Pyrénées-Atlantiques department in the Nouvelle-Aquitaine region in southwestern France.

It is located in the former province of Lower Navarre.

The inhabitants of the commune are known as Ainhiztars or Monjolostars.

Geography

Location
The town is part of the country Basque province of Cize of Lower Navarre. It is located in the Pyrenees mountains some 40 km in a direct line southeast of Bayonne and about 15 km northeast of the Spanish border. The commune is mostly farmland with scattered small forests.

Access
Access to Ainhice-Mongelos is via the Highway D933 (old highway 133) which runs northeast from Saint-Jean-le-Vieux which runs from southwest to northeast along the eastern side of the commune through the village of Mongelos continues northeast, ending near Saint Palais. Just south of the commune at Lacarre, the Highway D422 branches from the D933 to the northwest and passes through the western side of the commune, ending at Lopeenia just to the west of the commune. No other highways enter the commune. The village of Anhice-Mongelos can be reached by a country road from the D933 at Mongelos or by any of the many country roads which cover the commune.

Hydrography
In the Drainage basin of the Adour, the commune is traversed by a tributary of the Nive, the Lakako erreka (which originates in Ainhice-Mongelos) and, a tributary of the Laurhibar, the Arzubiko erreka and by tributaries of the latter, the Bassaguibeléko erreka and the Idiondoa brook. The Artikaitéko erreka which flows into Bidouze also passes through the commune.

Localities and hamlets

 Achurdé
 Ainhice
 Artikite
 Azeria
 Barnetchéa (Barnetxea)
 Bertéretchia
 Bidartéa
 Bidégaïnéa
 Caracoitchia
 Chilténéa
 Elizetchékoborda
 Erdoïs Etcheberria
 Erdoïsia
 Erretoraenia
 Etcheberritoa
 Etchéparéa
 Gohanetxea
 Harraldéa
 Harrispéa
 Héguilondoa
 Idiartekoborda
 Ihitsia
 Irazabalea
 Irumia
 Ithurraldéa
 Kousketikoborda
 Larraldéa
 Martiréma
 Mongelos
 Munhoa
 Officialdéya
 Orkaïtzéa
 Sallaberria

Toponymy
The name of the commune in Basque is Ainhize-Monjolose. According to Jean-Baptiste Orpustan the origin of the name Ainhice remains unknown. According to Brigitte Jobbé-Duval Mongelos is a Gascon name meaning Mont Jaloux (Mount Jealous).

The following table details the origins of the commune name and other names in the commune.

Sources:
Orpustan: Jean-Baptiste Orpustan,   New Basque Toponymy
Mérimée: Presentation of Ainhice-Mongelos on the Ministry of Culture database.
Raymond: Topographic Dictionary of the Department of Basses-Pyrenees, 1863, on the page numbers indicated in the table. 

Origins:
Pamplona: Titles of Pamplona
Biscay: Martin Biscay
Navarre: Regulations of the States of Navarre
Camara: Titles of the Camara de Comptos
Ohix: Contracts of Ohix
Bayonne: Visitations of the Diocese of Bayonne

History
The medieval village of Mongelos was established in 1240 as subject to the King of Navarre. Formerly subject to Ainhice, they were reunited on 16 August 1841.

Administration

List of Successive Mayors of Anhice-Mongelos

Inter-communality
The commune belongs to seven inter-communal organisations:
the Communauté d'agglomération du Pays Basque
the AEP union of Ainhice
the energy union of Pyrenees-Atlantiques
the school union for RPI Ainhice-Gamarthe-Lacarre
the inter-communal association for the development and management of the abattoir at Saint-Jean-Pied-de-Port
the joint association for the watershed of the Nive
the union to support Basque culture.

Population

Economy
Economic activity is mainly agricultural. The town is part of the zone of appellation of Ossau-iraty.

Euskal Herriko Laborantza Ganbara or the  "Chamber of Agriculture for the Basque Country" is an association under the law of 1901 founded on 15  January  2005 and is headquartered in Ainhice-Mongelos.

Culture and heritage

Languages
According to the Map of the Seven Basque Provinces published in 1863 by Prince Louis-Lucien Bonaparte, the dialect of Basque spoken in Ainhice-Mongelos is eastern low Navarrese.

Civil heritage
Several houses and farms are registered as historical monuments. These are:
Houses and Farms (18th & 19th century)
Barnetxea Farm (17th century)
Elizaldea Farm (17th century)
Etxeparea Farm (17th century)
Irazabalea Farm (17th century)

Religious Heritage

Church of the Assumption (14th century)

Facilities
The town has a kindergarten.

See also
 Communes of the Pyrénées-Atlantiques department

References

External links
Ainhice on the 1750 Cassini Map

Communes of Pyrénées-Atlantiques
Lower Navarre